Francisco Ferreira de Aguiar (11 November 1930 – 22 May 2012), known as Chico Formiga or simply Formiga, was a Brazilian footballer and manager. Mainly a central defender, he could also play as a defensive midfielder.

Formiga had his playing career mainly associated with Santos. As a manager, he was in charge of top tier sides Santos, São Paulo, Corinthians, Cruzeiro and América Mineiro.

Playing career

Club
Born in Araxá, Minas Gerais, Formiga joined Santos' youth setup in May 1950, but made his first team debut in the month after being promoted to the main squad by manager Artigas.

Formiga became a starter at Peixe in the 1952 season, winning the Campeonato Paulista twice for the club in 1955 and 1956. In the start of the 1957 season, he moved to Palmeiras for a fee of ₢$2 million plus the transfers of Laércio and Jair Rosa Pinto.

Formiga returned to Santos in 1959, taking part of the Os Santásticos squad that won two Copa Libertadores and two Intercontinental Cups. He retired in December 1962, after playing 410 matches and scoring twice for the club during his two spells.

International
Formiga played 18 matches for the Brazil national football team, making his full international debut on 20 September 1955 in a 2–1 win against Chile at the Pacaembu Stadium. He was initially called up to the 1958 FIFA World Cup, but had to withdraw due to an injury.

Managerial career
Shortly after retiring, Formiga remained at Santos to work in the club's youth categories. He took over the first team for the first time in 1978, winning the year's Paulistão, which ended only in 1979.

Formiga also worked at São Paulo between 1981 and 1982 before returning to Santos, where he was manager in another two periods. He was subsequently in charge of Corinthians, Cruzeiro, Portuguesa, Santo André, Catanduvense, Goiás and América Mineiro in his home country, aside from a period at Mexico's Universidad Guadalajara in 1990 and Japan's Oita Trinita in 1998.

In 2001, after being in charge of Palestra de São Bernardo in the previous campaign, Formiga returned to Peixe as a youth football coordinator. He left the club after a change in the organization chart.

Death
Formiga died on 22 May 2012, aged 81, due to a heart attack.

Career statistics

International

Honours

Player
Santos
Campeonato Paulista: 1955, 1956, 1960, 1961, 1962
Taça Brasil: 1961, 1962
Copa Libertadores: 1962, 1963
Intercontinental Cup: 1962, 1963

Manager
Santos
Campeonato Paulista: 1978

São Paulo
Campeonato Paulista: 1981

References

External links
Futebol de Goyaz profile 

1930 births
2012 deaths
Sportspeople from Minas Gerais
Brazilian footballers
Association football defenders
Santos FC players
Sociedade Esportiva Palmeiras players
Brazil international footballers
Brazilian football managers
Campeonato Brasileiro Série A managers
Santos FC managers
São Paulo FC managers
Sport Club Corinthians Paulista managers
Cruzeiro Esporte Clube managers
Associação Portuguesa de Desportos managers
Esporte Clube Santo André managers
Grêmio Esportivo Catanduvense managers
Goiás Esporte Clube managers
América Futebol Clube (MG) managers
Tecos F.C. managers
Oita Trinita managers
Brazilian expatriate football managers
Brazilian expatriate sportspeople in Mexico
Brazilian expatriate sportspeople in Japan
Expatriate football managers in Mexico
Expatriate football managers in Japan